A Clare County Council election was held in Ireland on 23 May 2014 as part of that year's local elections. Twenty-eight councillors were elected for a five-year term of office from four local electoral areas by proportional representation with a single transferable vote. This was a reduction in 4 council seats and 2 LEAs when compared to the previous elections held in 2009.

Fianna Fáil re-emerged as the largest party in Clare after the elections with 12 seats. In addition Clare Colleran-Molloy, a sister of the journalist Ger Colleran, won a seat for the party in Ennis and became the party's first ever female elected councillor. Brian Meaney, formerly of the Green Party, had defected to Fianna Fáil but failed to be re-elected. Fine Gael lost 4 seats in the election including that of the Council's outgoing Mayor, Joe Arkins, in Killaloe. The Labour Party lost their sole representative while Sinn Féin won a seat on the Council for the first time since 1974. Despite some retirements Independents retained a share of 7 seats.

Results by party

Results by Electoral Area

Ennis

Killaloe

Shannon

West Clare

References

External links
 Official website

2014 Irish local elections
2014